Małgorzata Tomassi is a Polish former fashion model and actress. Tomassi presently works as an interior designer. She is the wife of actor Stacy Keach, whom she met on the set of Mickey Spillane's Mike Hammer. She has performed alongside her husband in various Mike Hammer-related television shows, including Mickey Spillane's Mike Hammer, The New Mike Hammer and, most recently, Mike Hammer, Private Eye as the yoga instructor Maya Ricci.

Tomassi was born in Warsaw. In 2018, Małgorzata was appointed Polish Cultural Ambassador by the Polish Cultural Foundation.

References

External links

Living people
American television actresses
Models from Warsaw
Year of birth missing (living people)
Polish emigrants to the United States
Keach family